Riaz Ahmed (born 7 April 1939) is a former volleyball player from India. He represented  the India national team as a senior player at the 1966 Asian Games.

Career 
Riaz Ahmed was born in Mallepally, a suburb of Hyderabad. He was the eldest son of Syed Mohammed Rizvi and Afsar Jahan. He was encouraged to play volleyball from his Soccer coach in high school, because he noticed how Riaz was a one of a kind Athlete.  In 1958, Riaz became a member of the Andhra Pradesh Police Academy volleyball team. In 1960, he joined the India men's national volleyball team camp with Tilakam Gopal, Abdul Basith, Balwant Singh and many other Police cadets. Riaz represented the National Team several times from 1961 to 1973.

Riaz played for India's national volleyball team in the Asian Games in Bangkok (1966), where India took the 4th Seat  . He was one of the Indian team's most Senior players that influenced great players such as Jimmy George who played in the Asian Games in Tehran (1974), Bangkok (1978) and in Seoul (1986) where India won the bronze medal. He was captain of the Indian team that played at Saudi Arabia in 1985, and led the Indian team to victory in India Gold Cup International Volleyball Tournament at Hyderabad in 1986.

Ahmed competed in the following international competitions:
Represented the Indian volleyball team in the Inter-National Matches.
1961 – Represented India in the test match against the visiting Japanese team held at Calcutta.
1964 – Was a member of the Indian volleyball team which participated in the Olympics at Delhi in which all the Asian countries participated and won the bronze medal.
1965 – Was a captain of the Indian volleyball team which played five test matches against the visiting USSR team. The tests were played at Delhi, Bhilai, Rowa, Calcutta, and Cuttack.
1965 – The Indian team also played two unofficial matches against the Russian team at Balaghat and Allahabad. Ahmed was a captain of the team in these matches.
1966 – Was a Captain of the Indian volleyball team which participated in the Asian Games at Bangkok.
1967 – Was a Captain of the Indian team against the visiting Ceylonese volleyball team. The test matches were held at Calcutta and Dalmianagar.
1970 – Member of the Indian team which played five test matches against the visiting Paris University team. (The Paris University team contained six players who represented the French volleyball team) The tests were played at Hyderabad, Trivandrum, Jamshedpur, Udaipur, and Bombay. Ahmed was one of the captains of the Indian team at Hyderabad.

In the Inter-Civil Services All India Tournaments, Ahmed alongside Tilakam Gopal

represented the Andhra Pradesh Civil Service volleyball team

At the All India Inter Departmental Nationals, he represented the Andhra Pradesh Police Team:

 (Riaz And Gopal were Co-Captains of these teams)

At the All India Inter-Police Meets, he represented the Andhra Pradesh Police Team and helped the team to the following results:

References
 http://takhtejamshidcup.com/index.php?option=com_content&view=article&id=485&Itemid=1026
 "Volleyball shows the way"  Sportstar 27 Sept 2003 - 3 Oct 2003 Retrieved 21 March 2019

Recipients of the Arjuna Award
Indian men's volleyball players
Volleyball players at the 1978 Asian Games
1939 births
Asian Games competitors for India
Living people
Volleyball players from Hyderabad, India
Volleyball players at the 1966 Asian Games